Monster Island is an original novel based on the television series Buffy the Vampire Slayer and Angel. The plot revolves around the Scooby Gang and the Angel Investigations team joining forces to defeat General Axtius, the father of Angel's deceased ally Doyle.

Plot summary

Doyle's pure-blood Brachen demon father Axtius is the General for the Coalition of Purity which believes that all half-blood demons should be banished, leaving only the pure-bloods on Earth. Both Angel and Buffy are dealing with this threat in their respective cities when Buffy's team learns that General Axtius plans to attack a half-blood demon safe haven island near Los Angeles. Uprooting the Scooby Gang, Buffy and the rest of them travel quickly to Los Angeles to help Angel deal with the increasing problem. Unfortunately, the demons on the island who are in need of saving seem to be skeptical about having vampires as well as the Slayer on their island and they must be convinced that it's for their benefit before General Axtius and his troops launch a full-fledged attack on the island.

In their final confrontation on the island, Angel defeats Axtius when unarmed despite Axtius wielding a powerful mystical weapon, taunting the Brachen by saying that he would have been ashamed of Doyle's very human act of sacrifice and redemption. Having been defeated by Angel, Axtius is subsequently incinerated by his former second-in-command for his failure to destroy the island.

Continuity

This is supposed to fit into the timeline in early Buffy season 6 / Angel season 3
However Buffyverse canon that is established after this point contradicts much of the novel. For example, whilst in "Monster Island" Gunn and Spike meet. By canon they do not meet until early Angel season 5.

Canonical issues
Buffy/Angel books such as this one are not usually considered by fans as canonical. Some fans consider them stories from the imaginations of authors and artists, while other fans consider them as taking place in an alternative fictional reality. However unlike fan fiction, overviews summarising their story, written early in the writing process, were 'approved' by both Fox and Joss Whedon (or his office), and the books were therefore later published as officially Buffy/Angel merchandise.

External links
Cityofangel.com - Interview with Christopher Golden & Thomas E. Sniegoski about Monster Island.

Reviews
Slayerlit.us - Review of this book by Shiai
Litefoot1969.bravepages.com - Review of this book by Litefoot
Teen-books.com - Reviews of this book
Nika-summers.com - Review of this book by Nika Summers

Books based on Buffy the Vampire Slayer
2003 fantasy novels
Angel (1999 TV series) novels